State Road 564 (NM 564) is a  state highway in the US state of New Mexico. NM 564's western terminus is at NM 602 and the southern terminus of NM 610 in Gallup, and the eastern terminus is at NM 118 and Historic U.S. Route 66 (Hist US 66) in Gallup.

Major intersections

See also

References

564
Transportation in McKinley County, New Mexico
Gallup, New Mexico